Ordinary Failures is a 2022 sci-fi drama film directed by Cristina Groşan. It is a co-production between Czech Republic, Slovakia, Hungary and Italy.

The film premiered at the Venice Days section of the 79th edition of the Venice Film Festival.

Plot

Cast 

 Taťjana Medvecká as Hana
 Beáta Kaňoková  as  Silvia
  Nora Klimešová as  Tereza
 Vica Kerekes as  Edita
 Adam Berka as  David
 Rostislav Novák jr. as  Stanislav
 Jana Stryková as  Karolína
 Luboš Veselý as Václav

References

External links
 

2022 drama films
Czech drama films
2022 science fiction films
Czech science fiction films